Shaquille Momad da Conceição Nangy (born 24 November 1997), better known as Shaquille Nangy or simply Shaquille, is a Mozambican football player who currently plays for  The Mozambican National Team & Clube Ferroviário de Maputo. His position is Midfielder

References

External links 
Shaquille Momad Nangy at playmakerstats.com (English version of ceroacero.es and leballonrond.fr)

1997 births
Living people
People from Inhambane
Mozambican footballers
Association football defenders
Association football midfielders
Clube Ferroviário de Maputo footballers